tKatKa (pronounced 'Te-Kat-Ker') is a Swedish / English electronic music duo based in London, England.  The project is a collaboration between artists PJ Norman and Carlsson.  The group formed officially in 2004. Their first release was on a compilation for the gLASSsHRIMP show on Resonance FM. A white label of their track "Lazerslab" was first broadcast by the influential BBC Radio 1 DJ Annie Nightingale.

In 2006 they released two well-received singles ("Lazerslab" and "Bedroom Dust") and a full length self-titled album in 2007 on 100m Records. The covers for these releases were shot by Diana Scheunemann. Notably, they gained early support from DJs Mary Anne Hobbs, James Zabiela and Nick Luscombe.

In 2008 tKatKa released their second full-length album, "TerrorKnowledgeAction". The album included the single "Grief Hijackers" which was an extensive remix of the original song by Tom Hickox.

Singles 
 2006 "Lazerslab" - tKatKa (Junkbait)
 2006 "Bedroom Dust" - tKatKa (Junkbait)
 2008 "Grief Hijackers" - tKatKa vs Tom Hickox (100m)

Albums 
 2007 "tKatKa" - tKatKa (100m)
 2008 "TerrorKnowledgeAction" - tKatKa (100m)

Compilations 
"Drifting Skywards" - Various Artists (Cold Room Netlabel), features "Disarmchair" - tKatKa
"100m001" - Various Artists (100m Records), features "Global Fascist State" - tKatKa

Selected Live Appearances 
 2006 Bestival, Isle of Wight
 2007 Exceptional Records at the Big Chill House, London
 2008 Shortwave at 93 Feet East, London
 2008 The Social, London
 2008 The Night Shift at The Royal Festival Hall, London

Press 
Ambient beats mash-up masters
The collection of songs tKatKa have produced are stunning
... a whirring collage of warping electro beat melodies salaciously herded together under a glazing chassis of deliciously manicured updated Miami Vice like grandeur

References

External links
 tKatKa
 100m Records
 PJ Norman
 Carlsson
 Tom Hickox

Musical groups established in 2004
Electronica music groups